Hopps is a surname. Notable people with the surname include:

Frank Hopps (1894–1976), British military aviator
Harry Ryle Hopps (1869–1937), US businessman and artist
Jimmy Hopps (born 1939), US jazz drummer
John Hopps (physicist) (1939-2004), US physicist and politician
John Alexander Hopps (1919–1998), Canadian biomedical engineer
Walter Hopps (1932–2005), US museum director and curator

Fictional characters
 Judy Hopps, the primary protagonist of the animated film Zootopia. Of note is that, as a rabbit, the name more or less serves as a pun.

See also
Hopp
Hop (disambiguation)
Hoppe (disambiguation)

Surnames